Hans Merensky (16 March 1871 – 21 October 1952) was a South African geologist, prospector, scientist, conservationist and philanthropist. He discovered the rich deposit of alluvial diamonds at Alexander Bay in Namaqualand, vast platinum and chrome reefs at Lydenburg, Rustenburg and Potgietersrus, which led to some of the largest platinum mines in the world, phosphates and copper at Phalaborwa in the Transvaal lowveld, gold in the Free State and the world's biggest chrome deposit at Jagdlust near Pietersburg.

Life
Hans Merensky was born on 16 March 1871 at Berlin Missionary Society station Botshabelo, near Middelburg in Transvaal, where his father, Alexander Merensky (1837–1918), a noted ethnographer and author, was the resident missionary. Keenly interested in minerals and enjoying outdoor living, he studied mining geology after finishing his schooling in Germany. He was awarded a doctorate in mining geology from the University of Charlottenburg in Berlin. He completed his practical training in coal mines in the Saarland and in Silesia and began work for the Department of Mines in East Prussia. In 1904 he came to South Africa to conduct some geological surveys in the Transvaal. He discovered tin near Pretoria and reported to the Premier Diamond Mine regarding possible mining prospects. He worked for several mining companies and Friedlaender & Co. sent him to Madagascar to investigate a reported discovery of gold, which turned out to be false. He resigned from his job in Germany and moved to Johannesburg where he became a successful consulting geologist.

In 1909 he visited the diamond fields of South West Africa and controversially predicted that diamonds would be found along the West coast and south of the Orange River. In 1913 Merensky lost his entire fortune due to the Depression, and was interned at a camp near Pietermaritzburg. During these financially difficult years he enjoyed the support of Sir George Albu.

In 1924 he followed up the discovery of alluvial platinum by A F Lombard on his farm in Lydenburg and discovered its source in the Bushveld Igneous Complex which set him on the road to financial recovery. This deposit came eventually to be known as the Merensky Reef, which contains 75 per cent of the world's known platinum resources.

In 1926 diamonds were found at Alexander Bay and Merensky received £1,250,000 for his prospector's share. He established the Phosphate Development Corporation Ltd. - FOSKOR - to manage the extraction of phosphates at Phalaborwa.

In his final years he lived unostentatiously on his farm Westfalia near Duiwelskloof in Transvaal, where he received local celebrities and foreign dignitaries. He died on 21 October 1952.

Legacy 
Merensky allotted the larger part of his fortune to the Hans Merensky Trust to ensure that his projects in agriculture, horticulture and forestry operations on the Westfalia Estate would be continued after his death. He established the Hans Merensky Library at the University of Pretoria.

In 2004, Martin Enlen directed a German language movie called Platinum based on Hans Merensky's life. Both overdubbed and subtitled English versions of this movie exist.

The Hans Merensky Wilderness, a protected area in Limpopo, and Merensky High School, an agricultural and academic public school on a farm near Tzaneen, are named after him.

Notes

References

Further reading 
 
 

1871 births
1952 deaths
People from Steve Tshwete Local Municipality
South African expatriates in Germany
South African geologists
South African people of German descent
South African Republic people
White South African people
19th-century German geologists